The counts of Tusculum, also known as the Theophylacti, were a family of secular noblemen from Latium that maintained a powerful position in Rome between the 10th and 12th centuries. Several popes and an antipope during the 11th century came from their ranks. They created and perfected the political formula of noble-papacy, wherein the pope was arranged to be elected only from the ranks of the Roman nobles. The Pornocracy, the period of influence by powerful female courtesans of the family, also influenced papal history.

The counts of Tusculum remained arbiters of Roman politics and religion for more than a century. In addition to the papal influence, they held lay power through consulships and senatorial membership. Traditionally they were pro-Byzantine and anti-Germanic in their political affiliation.

After 1049, the Tusculan Papacy came to an end with the appointment of Pope Leo IX. In fact, the Tusculan papacy was largely responsible for the reaction known as the Gregorian reform. Subsequent events (from 1062 onwards) confirmed a shift in regional politics as the counts came to side with the Holy Roman Emperors against the Rome of the reformers. In 1059, the papal-decree of Pope Nicholas II established new rules for the papal election, therefore putting an end to the noble-papacy formula.

Counts and their titles
This list is partially incomplete in the tenth century and the chronology and dates of the various countships are often uncertain. They were only counts from about 1013, lords before.
before 924 Theophylact I 
until 924 Alberic I, (Consul) son-in-law of Theophylact I
924–954 Alberic II, son of Alberic I
before 1013 Gregory I, (Excellentissimus vir – Praefectus navalis) son of Alberic II
until 1012 Theophylact II, son of Gregory I
1012–1024 Romanus, (Consul et dux, senator) brother of Theophylact II and son of Gregory I
1024–1032 Alberic III, (Imperialis palatii magister Consul et dux – Comes sacri palatii Lateranensis) brother of Theophylact II and Romanus
1032–1045 Theophylact III son of Alberic III 
1044–1058 Gregory II, (Consul, nobilis vir, senator Comes Tusculanensis) son of Alberic III
1058 – c. 1108 Gregory III, (Comes Tusculanensis Consul, illustris) son of Gregory II
c. 1108 – 1126 Ptolemy I (Tolomeo I), (Consul, comes Tusculanus) son Gregory III
1126–1153 Ptolemy II (Tolomeo II), (Illustrissimus, dominus Consul et dux) son of Ptolemy I
1153 – c. 1167 Jonathan, (Comes de Tusculano) co-ruler with Raino  son of Ptolemy II
1153–1179 Raino, (Nobilis vir, dominus) brother of Jonathan, co-ruler with Jonathan

Tusculan popes

John XI, son of Alberic I, pope 931–935
John XII son of Alberic II, pope 955–964
Benedict VII, nephew of Alberic II, pope 974–983
Benedict VIII, son of Gregory I, pope 1012–1024 (also count)
John XIX, son of Gregory I, pope 1024–1032 (also count)
Benedict IX, son of Alberic III, pope 1032–1048 (also count)
Benedict X, antipope 1058–1059

Successors
According to tradition, the successors of the Tusculum counts  were the Colonna family, founded by Peter (1099–1151), son of Gregory III and called Peter "de Columna" from his fief of Colonna, east of Rome.

References
Thietmar of Merseburg – Chronicle
Ferdinand Gregorovius  Geschichte der Stadt Rom im Mittelalter (1859–1872)

External links

 
Tusculum
People from Lazio
Tusculum
Tusculum
Tusculum

de:Tusculum#Grafen von Tusculum